is a Japanese football player. He plays for Nara Club.

Playing career 
Yuki Onishi join to J2 League club; Kyoto Sanga FC in 2015. In 2016 season, he moved to Nara Club.

Club statistics 
Updated to 20 February 2017.

References

External links 

Profile at Nara Club

1996 births
Living people
Association football people from Nara Prefecture
Japanese footballers
J2 League players
J3 League players
Japan Football League players
Kyoto Sanga FC players
Nara Club players
J.League U-22 Selection players
Association football defenders